Hiroyuki Abe (阿部 博幸) is a former Japanese international table tennis player.

He won a bronze medal at the 1983 World Table Tennis Championships in the men's doubles with Seiji Ono. He also won two bronze medals in the men's team event.

See also
 List of table tennis players
 List of World Table Tennis Championships medalists

References

Japanese male table tennis players
Asian Games medalists in table tennis
Table tennis players at the 1978 Asian Games
Table tennis players at the 1982 Asian Games
Medalists at the 1978 Asian Games
Medalists at the 1982 Asian Games
Asian Games gold medalists for Japan
Asian Games silver medalists for Japan
Asian Games bronze medalists for Japan
World Table Tennis Championships medalists
20th-century Japanese people